The Kew Gardens train crash (also known as the Richmond Hill disaster) was a collision between two trains on the Long Island Rail Road's Main Line, which occurred during the evening rush hour of November 22, 1950. The trains collided between Kew Gardens and Jamaica stations in Kew Gardens, Queens, New York City, killing 78 people and injuring 363. The crash is the worst railway accident in LIRR history, and one of the worst in the history of New York State.

Background
An eastbound Hempstead-bound train consisting of 12 cars and carrying about 1,000 passengers left Pennsylvania Station at 6:09 p.m. Once engaged, the brakes would not release, and the train halted. While the engineer investigated the problem, the brakeman, traveling in the rear car, got out and held a red lantern to warn any train following, as per the regulations. He then heard the traction motors power; believing that the brakes were now working and that the train was about to depart, he turned off the lantern and re-boarded the rear car. He had not received a signal by the train's whistle to return to the train. The brakes were still locked on and the Hempstead-bound train remained where it was, in the dark, without any protection from the rear.

Four minutes after the Hempstead train departed Penn Station, a train bound for Babylon station carrying 1,200 passengers departed Penn Station on the same track.

Collision
Meanwhile, the brakeman on the Hempstead train signaled to his engineer that he was back aboard and the train could proceed, but he did not receive any response; he signaled again but the train stayed where it was. He prepared to get back onto the track when the Babylon train hit. Before he was killed the Babylon train's engineer applied the emergency brake but it was still travelling at  when it collided with the stationary train. Neither train derailed; the impact pushed the stationary train forward  and split its last car lengthwise as the front car of the Babylon train telescoped into it, shearing off the superstructure above the floor and driving the roof  into the air.

In the ensuing collision, 78 people were killed (including everyone aboard the last car of the Hempstead train, who were crushed by the impact of the Babylon train) and 363 were injured. One witness described the dead as "packed like sardines in their own blood". A survivor recounted: "All I could see was parts of bodies, arms and legs protruding from the windows". Many of those who survived the impact were trapped in the darkness, unable to move in the pileup of dead bodies, amidst the screams and wails of the dying.

Response
In the aftermath of the crash, all of the police detectives on duty in Queens were summoned to the site, as were 200 physicians coming from every hospital in the borough. Police and fire personnel cut through the wreckage with torches, and used ladders to allow doctors and nurses to provide medical aid for those trapped inside. Emergency responders were also summoned from other boroughs. It was more than five hours before the last people still alive were removed from the wreckage.

Aftermath
A four-way investigation was quickly convened after the Kew Gardens collision. The official cause of the crash was determined to be the disregard of the "Go Slow" signal by the Babylon train's engineer, who died in the crash. He had instead reacted to the "All Clear" signal half a mile ahead. The brakeman of the Hempstead train was also criticized for leaving his train unprotected during the critical moments.

The accident happened only nine months after another crash involving LIRR trains at Rockville Centre killed 32 people. The LIRR had suffered from years of underinvestment, as the cars involved in this crash were built during 1910 and their ages were typical of the fleet's as a whole. The New York Public Service Commission had prevented the LIRR from increasing fares between 1918 and 1947, despite the railroad's increased operating costs. At the time of the accident, the LIRR had already filed for bankruptcy reorganization.

In an investigative report published in response to the crash, the Public Service Commission found that fatigue and a lack of proper crew procedures were elements in both the Rockville Centre and Kew Gardens crashes. The commission suggested six improvements that could be made to the LIRR, including signal improvements and automatic train control. After the crash, the LIRR began a $6 million program to install Automatic Speed Control (ASC) on its tracks. The first segment of ASC went into service in May 1951. The Pennsylvania Railroad (the then-owner of the LIRR) terminated the bankruptcy and began a 12-year improvement program at a cost of $58 million. The LIRR was exempted from much of its tax burden and gained freedom to charge realistic fares. Ultimately, the LIRR became reorganized as part of the Metropolitan Transportation Authority, which was formed to manage the LIRR and still operates it.

References

External links
A Picture History of Kew Gardens, NY includes links to several other pages, including the official ICC report 
News Clip from Long Island Train Crash November 22, 1950
November 22, 1950 Collision at Richmond Hill west of Jamaica Station

Railway accidents in 1950
Railway accidents and incidents in New York City
1950 in New York City
1950s in Queens
Transportation in Queens, New York
Accidents and incidents involving Long Island Rail Road
Kew Gardens, Queens
Railway accidents involving a signal passed at danger
November 1950 events in the United States
Train collisions in the United States
Rail accidents caused by a driver's error